David Benjamin Tendlar  (August 8, 1909 – September 9, 1993) was an American animator, best known for his work with Fleischer Studios and its successor, Famous Studios.

Tendlar was born in Dayton, Ohio on August 8, 1909. He joined Fleischer Studio in 1931, where he worked on Betty Boop, Popeye the Sailor, and many other shorts, as well as Fleischer's two feature-length animated films. Tendlar stayed on at Famous Studios after Paramount Pictures foreclosed on Fleischer and reorganized the company into Famous Studios. Tendlar was promoted to director at Famous Studios in 1953 (he also directed a Noveltoon "A Self-Made Mongrel" in 1945). He later did work for Terrytoons, Hal Seeger Productions, Filmation and Hanna-Barbera. In addition to his animation work, Tendlar moonlighted as a comic book artist, providing illustrations for Jingle Jangle Comics and Harvey Comics as well as producing promotional comic books. He died in Los Angeles, California on September 9, 1993, at the age of 84.

References

External links
 
 David Tendlar entry at the Comiclopedia

1909 births
1993 deaths
American animators
American comics artists
Artists from Dayton, Ohio
Fleischer Studios people
Terrytoons people
Filmation people
Hanna-Barbera people
Famous Studios people